Meftah (meaning key in Arabic) may refer to:

Meftah (town), a town and commune in Blida Province, Algeria 
Meftah District, a district in Blida Province, Algeria

People
Mohamed Rabie Meftah, Algerian footballer
Mahieddine Meftah, former Algerian national footballer
Rahim Meftah, Algerian footballer
Jugurtha Meftah, Algerian football player
Chaâbane Meftah, Algerian football player
Meftah Ghazalla, Libyan football goalkeeper
Habib Meftah Bouchehri, Iranian percussionist
Abdellatif Meftah, French long-distance runner

See also
 Miftah (disambiguation)
 MEFTA (disambiguation)

Arabic-language surnames